Andrey Semyonov may refer to:
Andrei Semenov (fighter) (born 1977), Russian mixed martial arts fighter
Andrey Semyonov-Tyan-Shansky (1866–1942), Russian entomologist and beetle expert
Andrei Semyonov (footballer, born 1957), Russian football player
Andrei Semyonov (footballer, born 1989), Russian football player
Andrei Semyonov (footballer, born 1992), Russian football player
Andrey Semyonov (sprinter) (born 1977), Russian sprinter, medallist at the 2002 European Athletics Championships

See also
Semyonov (disambiguation)